Arakkillam is a 1967 Indian Malayalam-language film, directed by N. Sankaran Nair and produced by N. Sankaran Nair. The film stars Sathyan, Sharada, Miss Kumari and Adoor Bhasi. The film had musical score by G. Devarajan.

Cast
Sathyan
Sharada
Miss Kumari
Adoor Bhasi
Paul Vengola
Kaduvakulam Antony
Kottayam Chellappan
Rathidevi
S. P. Pillai
Sree Narayana Pillai

Soundtrack
The music was composed by G. Devarajan and the lyrics were written by Vayalar Ramavarma.

References

External links
 

1967 films
1960s Malayalam-language films
Films directed by N. Sankaran Nair